Michel Laub (born 1973 in Porto Alegre) is a Brazilian writer and journalist.

Biography 
Laub graduated in Law at the Federal University of Rio Grande do Sul in 1996. He also enrolled in the Journalism  at PUC-RS, but did not complete he course. He worked for a few months as a lawyer in Porto Alegre, his hometown, but gave up the career.

Laub wrote about business and politics for the magazines Carta Capital and República. In 1997, he moved to São Paulo, where he worked on Bravo! magazine, which became managing editor. In 1998 published his first book, the short story collection Não depois do que aconteceu.

He was the coordinator of publications and courses of Instituto Moreira Salles, later assuming the function of editor for their website.

His first novel Música Anterior was published in 2001. In 2005 he was awarded a scholarship from Fundação Vitae, which enabled him to write O Segundo Tempo. Diário da Queda (published in English as Diary of the Fall), written with support from a grant from Funarte, was his first work to address his Jewish origins, from the diaries of his grandfather, a survivor of the concentration camp of Auschwitz.

Awards and honors
2002 Erico Verissimo Award from União Brasileira de Escritores (Brazilian Union of Writers) New Author Category for Música Anterior
2012 Brasilia Prize for Literature in category Novel during the 1st Bienal de Brasília do Livro e Literatura for Diary of the Fall
???? Bravo Award / Bradesco  for Best Novel for Diary of the Fall
???? Granta Magazine "The Best of Young Brazilian Writers"
2012 Portugal Telecom Award shortlist for Diary of the Fall
2015 Jewish Quarterly-Wingate Prize winner for Diary of the Fall (Translated by Margaret Jull Costa)

Published works 
1998 - Não Depois do que Aconteceu - short stories
2001 - Música anterior - novel
2004 - Longe da água - novel
2006 - O segundo tempo - novel
2009 - O gato diz adeus - novel
2011 - Diary of the Fall - novel
2013 - A maçã envenenada- novel
2016 - O Tribunal da quinta-feira- novel
2020  - Solução de dois estados - novel

References

External links
Personal blog (in Portuguese)
Author profile at Companhia das Letras website (in Portuguese)

1973 births
Brazilian male writers
Living people
People from Porto Alegre